Perthida is a genus of moths of the family Incurvariidae.

Species
Perthida glyphopa Common, 1969 
Perthida pentaspila (Meyrick, 1916) 
Perthida phoenicopa (Meyrick, 1893) 
Perthida tetraspila (Lower, 1905)

References
Perthida at funet

Incurvariidae
Adeloidea genera